Jakob Linckh (1786 or 14 November 1787 – 1841) was a German painter and archaeologist, born in Cannstatt.

In 1810–11, he accompanied Charles Robert Cockerell, John Foster, Carl Haller von Hallerstein and Otto Magnus von Stackelberg on their expeditions to the temples of Aphaia on Aegina and of Apollo at Bassae.  On this trip he also drew a plan of the ancient theatre at Eretria.

References

1780s births
1841 deaths
Year of birth uncertain
19th-century German painters
19th-century German male artists
German male painters
Archaeologists from Baden-Württemberg